George Koonce (born October 15, 1968) is an American athlete and athletic director. A former linebacker in the National Football League (NFL), he served as the athletic director at the University of Wisconsin–Milwaukee between 2009 and 2010.

Playing career

Atlanta Falcons

Koonce was signed as an undrafted free agent by the Atlanta Falcons out of the East Carolina University, but was waived during the preseason.

WLAF Ohio Glory

Koonce started at linebacker for the World League's Ohio Glory in 1992.

Green Bay Packers

He was then signed  by the Green Bay Packers before the 1992 season. He played for the Packers from 1992–1999. He was an eight-year starter as the Packers returned to dominance, starting 102 of 112 games. He played all three linebacker positions with the Packers and was with the team when they won Super Bowl XXXI.

Seattle Seahawks

He was signed by the Seattle Seahawks as an unrestricted free agent before the 2000 season, and started all 16 games. After the 2000 season he retired with 720 tackles, 9 sacks, and 5 interceptions in 128 games (118 starts).

NFL statistics

Post-playing career
He was inducted into the National Junior College Hall of Fame in 2000 and also the hall of fame at East Carolina University. In 1999, he founded the George Koonce Sr. Foundation to provide underprivileged children with educational, athletic, artistic and social opportunities which assist their development. Koonce's post-career ambitions have been centered around the world of academics. Earning his Master's in Sports Management from East Carolina University and Ph.D. from Marquette University (one of only two players in Packers 100-year history to earn a PhD), Koonce has affectionately become known as “The Doctor of Defense.” He is a member of the NFL Player Engagement Advisory Board and has co-authored a book entitled Is There Life After Football? – Surviving the NFL. Currently, he serves as Senior Vice President of the Office of University Relations at Marian University in Fond du Lac, Wisconsin where he provides leadership and strategic direction while being responsible for growing awareness and increasing philanthropic support for the university through community and alumni engagement.  Koonce also serves as an on-air personality at Green Bay's CBS affiliate for “Backstage with George Koonce,” and “Locker Room".

East Carolina University
He spent of two years as an Assistant Athletic Director for Development, assisting with fundraising and marketing of the department. He also earned his master's degree in Sport Management in 2006 from ECU.

Green Bay Packers
He served in the Packers front office as the Director of Player Development for the Green Bay Packers for the 2006 season. Koonce currently serves on the Packers Board of Directors.

Marquette University
He served as the Senior Associate Director of Athletics at Marquette University in Milwaukee, Wisconsin. He was responsible for fundraising, major gifts, community relations, and student welfare. He joined the Golden Eagles in 2007. He also pursued his Ph.D. in Sport Administration while at Marquette.

University of Wisconsin–Milwaukee
He was introduced as the new University of Wisconsin–Milwaukee Director of Athletics on March 17, 2009, and began his duties on April 1.  He was placed on administrative leave in April 2010, and his resignation was announced on June 2, 2010. The Milwaukee Journal Sentinel reported, "Koonce's resignation was related to the death of Koonce's wife, Tunisia, who died of cancer last October" and that "the death of Koonce's wife put (him) in the position of being the principal caretaker for his two children, ages 3 and 12."

Marian University
In 2014, Koonce was hired as the Vice-President of Advancement at Marian University in Fond du Lac, Wisconsin.  The university described his job duties as "growing awareness and increasing philanthropic support" within the region.

References

1968 births
Living people
American football linebackers
Chowan Hawks football players
East Carolina Pirates football players
Green Bay Packers players
Ohio Glory players
Milwaukee Panthers athletic directors
Seattle Seahawks players
Sportspeople from New Bern, North Carolina
Players of American football from North Carolina